Jiří Ferebauer (born February 18, 1989) is a Czech professional ice hockey player. He played with HC České Budějovice in the Czech Extraliga during the 2010–11 Czech Extraliga season.

Career statistics

References

External links

1989 births
Living people
BK Mladá Boleslav players
Czech ice hockey forwards
HC Tábor players
IHC Písek players
LHK Jestřábi Prostějov players
Motor České Budějovice players
SK Horácká Slavia Třebíč players
KLH Vajgar Jindřichův Hradec players
Sportspeople from České Budějovice